Arménio Fernandes (born 9 November 1959) is an Angolan sprinter. He competed in the men's 100 metres at the 1988 Summer Olympics in Seol. He competed in the ninth heat of round one, but did not progress.

References

External links
 

1959 births
Living people
Athletes (track and field) at the 1988 Summer Olympics
Angolan male sprinters
Olympic athletes of Angola
Place of birth missing (living people)